The 2006 Bedford Borough Council election took place on 4 May 2006 to elect members of Bedford Borough Council in England. This was on the same day as  other local elections.

Prior to the election, one councillor left the Labour group to sit as an Independent.

Summary

Election result

References

Bedford
Bedford Borough Council elections
2000s in Bedfordshire